"Ain't Never Gonna Give You Up" is the third and final single from Paula Abdul's album, Head over Heels. The song was written by Bryan Abrams, Curtis "Fitz" Williams, Elliot Wolff, Howie Tee, Kevin Thornton, and Mark Calderon.

Song information
Both the single and video received a lot of airplay on radio.

The song features background vocals from the group Color Me Badd. Abdul performed the song on The Tonight Show hosted by Jay Leno.

Track listings and formats
US 5" CD

 Ain't Never Gonna Give You Up – Single Edit (Bryan Abrams; Curtis "Fitz" Williams; Elliot Wolff; Howie Tee; Kevin Thornton; Mark Calderon)3:27
 Ain't Never Gonna Give You Up – Livingsting Remix   3:57
 Ain't Never Gonna Give You Up – Livingsting Club Mix     4:09
 Love Don't Come Easy – LP (Paula Abdul; Michael Stuart Ani aka "Da'Count"; Eric Monsanty; Howard Hersh; Iki Levy; Robb Boldt)    4:14

Official remixes
Single Edit 3:26
Livingston Remix 3:57
Livingston Club Mix 4:04

Charts

References 

1995 songs
1996 singles
Paula Abdul songs
Songs written by Sam Watters
Songs written by Elliot Wolff
Music videos directed by Matthew Rolston
Virgin Records singles
Hip hop soul songs
New jack swing songs